Laelius is a genus of hymenopteran parasitoids in the family Bethylidae. Laelius species are ectoparasitoids of immature stages of beetles, such as Dermestidae, and thus are commonly taken indoors. There are 57 extent species worldwide and 4 additional species known from fossil records in amber. A number of species have recently been moved from the genus Rhabdepyris to Laelius.

Living species and their distribution:

 Laelius agraensis Kurian, 1955 - India
 Laelius akares Barbosa & Azevedo, 2009 - Madagascar
 Laelius anfractuosus Benoit, 1952 - Algeria
 Laelius anthrenivorus Trani, 1909 - France, Italy, Romania
 Laelius antropovi Gorbatovsky, 1955 - Russia
 Laelius arryni Barbosa & Azevedo, 2014 - Brazil
 Laelius baratheoni Barbosa & Azevedo, 2014 - Brazil
 Laelius billi Barbosa & Azevedo, 2014 - Brazil, Mexico, Nicaragua, USA 
 Laelius bipartitus Kieff er, 1906 - France
 Laelius borealis Vikberg, 2005 - Finland, Sweden
 Laelius brachistos Barbosa & Azevedo, 2010 - United Arab Emirtates
 Laelius canchinensis (Azevedo, 1992) - Brazil
 Laelius centratus (Say, 1836) - Canada, Mexico, USA
 Laelius elisae Russo, 1938 - Italy
 Laelius femoralis (Förster, 1860) - Finland, Germany, Sweden
 Laelius firmipennis (Cameron, 1905) - South Africa
 Laelius fulvipes Kieffer, 1906 -  Israel, Italy, Romania, Spain
 Laelius fumimarginalis Vikberg, 2005 - Sweden
 Laelius glossinae (Turner & Waterston, 1916) - Malawi
 Laelius gracilis (Evans, 1965) - Mexico, USA
 Laelius haplos Barbosa & Azevedo, 2011 - Australia
 Laelius hirticulus (Evans, 1965) - Brazil, Panama
 Laelius huachucae (Evans, 1965) - USA
 Laelius lannisteri Barbosa & Azevedo, 2014 - Brazil
 Laelius maboya (Snelling, 1996) - British Virgin Island
 Laelius martelli Barbosa & Azevedo, 2014 - Brazil
 Laelius mekes Barbosa & Azevedo, 2009 - Madagascar
 Laelius mellipes (Evans, 1965) - USA
 Laelius mesitioides (Duchaussoy, 1916) - Canary Islands
 Laelius microneurus (Kieff er, 1906) - Belgium, France, Japan
 Laelius minutulus (Evans, 1965) - Peru
 Laelius muesebecki (Evans, 1965) - Bolivia, Costa Rica, Ecuador, Honduras, Mexico, USA
 Laelius multilineatus (Evans, 1966) - Ecuador
 Laelius naniwaensis Terayama, 2006 - Japan
 Laelius nigriscapus (Evans, 1965) - Argentina
 Laelius nigrofemoratus Terayama, 2006 - Japan
 Laelius ogmos Barbosa & Azevedo, 2011 - Thailand
 Laelius parcepilosus Vikberg, 2005 - Finland
 Laelius pedatus (Say, 1836) - Brazil, Canada, Mexico, UAE, USA
 Laelius perrisi  Kieffer, 1906 - France
 Laelius quadrangulus Barbosa & Azevedo, 2011 - Australia
 Laelius ruficrus Kieffer, 1906 - Italy
 Laelius rufipes (Förster, 1860) - France, Germany
 Laelius seticornis (Duchaussoy, 1916) - Canary Islands
 Laelius simplex Evans, 1978 - USA
 Laelius sinicus Xu, He & Terayama, 2003 - China
 Laelius starki Barbosa & Azevedo, 2014 - Brazil
 Laelius targaryeni Barbosa & Azevedo, 2014 - Brazil
 Laelius tibialis Kieffer, 1906 - France
 Laelius titanokkos Barbosa & Azevedo, 2011 - Thailand
 Laelius tullyi Barbosa & Azevedo, 2014 - Brazil
 Laelius utilis Cockcrell, 192 - Canada, Sweden, USA
 Laelius versicolor (Evans, 1970) - Virgin Islands
 Laelius virilis Vikberg, 2005 - Finland
 Laelius voracis Muesebeck, 1939 - India, USA
 Laelius yamatonis Terayama, 2006 - Japan
 Laelius yokohamensis Terayama, 2006  - Japan

Extinct species:

 Laelius rovnensis Barbosa & Azevedo, 2012
 Laelius preteritus Barbosa & Azevedo, 2012
 Laelius pallidus Brues, 1933
 Laelius nudipennis Brues, 1933

References 

Chrysidoidea
Hymenoptera genera